Chen Jianlong (born 14 May 1989) is a professional Chinese footballer who currently plays as a defender for Meizhou Kejia in the China League One.

Club career
Chen Jianlong would play for the Guangzhou Pharmaceutical youth team before going on loan to third-tier club Guangdong Sunray Cave to being his senior career in the 2007 Chinese league season. With Guangdong, he would soon go on to establish himself as a regular within their side and by the 2008 league season he was already the captain of the team that won promotion to the second tier after the club came runners-up within the 2008 Chinese League Two division. By his third season, he had lost his captaincy to Joel, but established the club as mid-table regulars before he returned to Guangzhou in December 2009 after three seasons. Back at Guangzhou he would make his debut for them on 3 April 2010, in a 3–1 home win against Beijing Institute of Technology.

With Guangzhou, he would be part of the squad that won the 2010 Chinese League One division and promotion where he also won the 2011 Chinese Super League title, however throughout this he would mainly play a small part as a squad player. To gain more playing time, Chen was loaned to Chinese Super League side Shanghai Shenxin on 5 January 2012.

Chen moved to China League Two side Meizhou Kejia in 2013.

Honours
Guangzhou Evergrande
Chinese Super League: 2011
China League One: 2010

Meizhou Kejia
China League Two: 2015

References

External links

1989 births
Living people
Chinese footballers
Footballers from Maoming
Guangzhou F.C. players
Guangdong Sunray Cave players
Shanghai Shenxin F.C. players
Meizhou Hakka F.C. players
Chinese Super League players
China League One players
Association football defenders